This is a list of notable people who were born or have lived in Saratov, Russia.

Born in Saratov

19th century

1801–1850 
 Stepan Shevyryov (1806–1864), conservative Russian literary historian and poet
 Konstantin von Kügelgen (1810–1880), German painter
 Nikolay Chernyshevsky (1828–1889), Russian revolutionary democrat, materialist philosopher, critic and socialist
 Alexander Pypin (1833–1904), Russian literary historian, ethnographer, journalist and editor
 Firs Zhuravlev (1836–1901), Russian genre painter

1851–1900 
 Nikolai Grandkovsky (1864–1907), Russian Realist painter who specialized in portraits and genre scenes
 Bina Abramowitz (1865 - 1953), Yiddish-language actress
 Victor Borisov-Musatov (1870–1905), Russian painter
 Pavel Kuznetsov (1878–1968), Russian painter and graphic artist
 Alexander Matveyev (1878–1960), Russian sculptor
 Alexei Rykov (1881–1938), Russian Bolshevik revolutionary and Soviet politician; Premier of Russia and the Soviet Union
 Alexander Savinov (1881–1942), Russian and Soviet painter and art educator
 Anna Andreevna Kalmanovich (fl. 1893–1917), Russian feminist and activist
 Georgy Fedotov (1886–1951), Russian religious philosopher, historian, essayist, author of many books on Orthodox culture, regarded by some as a founder of Russian "theological culturology"
 Georgy Oppokov (1888–1938), Russian Bolshevik
 Rachel Bluwstein (1890–1931), Hebrew-language poet
 Isaak Zelensky (1890–1938), Russian politician; Secretary General of the Uzbek Soviet Socialist Republic
 Konstantin Fedin (1892–1977), Russian novelist and literary functionary
 Nikolay Semyonov (1896–1986), Russian Soviet physicist and chemist; awarded the 1956 Nobel Prize in Chemistry for his work on the mechanism of chemical transformation
 Stepan Kayukov (1898–1960), Soviet actor
 Viktor Bolkhovitinov (1899–1970), Soviet engineer, team-leader of the developers of the Bereznyak-Isayev BI-1 aircraft
 Nadezhda Mandelstam (1899–1980), Russian writer and educator

20th century

1901–1930 
 Alexander Bek (1903–1972), Soviet novelist and writer
 Jerzy Pichelski (1903–1963), Polish film and theatre actor
 Boris Babochkin (1904–1975), Soviet film and theatre actor and director
 Viktor Wagner (1908–1981), Russian mathematician
 Vladimir Ovchinnikov (1911–1978), Soviet and Russian painter
 Sweeney Schriner (1911–1990), Russian-born Canadian professional ice hockey forward
 Sergey Filippov (1912–1990), Soviet film and theatre actor
 Nikolai Minkh (1912–1982), Soviet composer, conductor and pianist
 Boris Andreyev (1915–1982), Soviet actor
 Michel Garder (1916–1993), French author and military man
 Alexander Obukhov (1918–1989), Russian physicist and applied mathematician
 Raisa Aronova (1920–1982), Russian Po-2 pilot in World War II
 Vladimir Vengerov (1920–1997), Soviet film director
 Jan Białostocki (1921–1988), Polish art historian
 Boris Balashov (1927–1974), Editor-in-Chief of the Soviet magazine "Filateliya SSSR" ("Philately of the USSR")
 Nikolai Krogius (born 1930), Russian Chess Grandmaster, International Arbiter, psychologist, chess coach, chess administrator and author

1931–1950 
 Joseph G. Hakobyan (born 1931), Russian scientist
 Mikhail Shakhov (born 1931), Soviet wrestler
 Lev Pitaevskii (born 1933), Soviet theoretical physicist
 Oleg Tabakov (1935–2018), Soviet and Russian actor and the artistic director of the Moscow Art Theatre
 Irma Raush (born 1938), Russian actress
 Yury Sharov (born 1939), Soviet fencer
 Yuri Simonov (born 1941), Russian conductor
 Boris Gromov (born 1943), prominent Russian military and political figure; Governor of Moscow Oblast from 2000 to 2012
 Evgeny Rukhin (1943–1976), Russian Non-Conformist painter
 Lydia Mordkovitch (1944–2014), Russian violinist
 Vladimir Lantsberg (1948–2005), Russian poet, songwriter, bard and teacher
 Alexander Zemlianichenko (born 1950), Russian photojournalist

1951–1970 
 Vladimir Konkin (born 1951), Soviet and Russian cinema and theatre actor
 Sergei Shuvalov (1951–2021), Soviet and Russian politician
 Alexander Koreshkov (born 1952), Russian professional football coach and player
 Alexander Sukhanov (born 1952), Soviet and Russian poet, composer, bard and mathematician
 Lyubov Sliska (born 1953), Russian politician
 Marina Shimanskaya (born 1955), Russian actress
 Sergei Konyagin (born 1957), Russian mathematician
 Andrei Shevtsov (born 1961), Russian professional footballer
 Yuri Klyuchnikov (born 1963), Russian professional football referee and player
 Julia Gomelskaya (born 1964), Ukrainian composer of contemporary classical music
 Vladimir Lazarev (born 1964), Russian and French chess Grandmaster
 Roman Abramovich (born 1966), Russian businessman, investor and politician
 Anatoli Fedotov (born 1966), Russian professional ice hockey player
 Yevgeny Mironov (born 1966), Russian film and stage actor
 Dmitry Chernyshenko (born 1968), Russian businessman and the President of the Sochi 2014 Olympic Organizing Committee for the 2014 Winter Olympics 
 Filipp Yankovsky (born 1968), Russian actor and film director
 Igor Meglinski (born 1968), British scientist

1971–1980 
 Kseniya Kachalina (born 1971), Russian actress
 Inessa Korkmaz (born 1972), Russian female volleyball player
 Sergei Nikolayev (born 1972), Russian professional ice hockey goaltender
 Yulia Timofeeva (born 1972), Russian former track and field sprinter and bobsledder
 Alexey Ashapatov (born 1973), Russian paralympian athlete competing mainly in category F57-58 throwing events
 Yuliya Levina (born 1973), Russian rower
 Alexei Yegorov (born 1976), Russian professional ice hockey goaltender
 Zanna Proniadu (born 1978), Greek female volleyball player
 Ksenya Stepanycheva (born 1978), Russian playwright
 Vadim Garin (born 1979), Russian professional football player

1981–1990 
 Aleksei Ivanov (born 1981), Russian professional football player
 Denis Platonov (born 1981), Russian professional ice hockey centre
 Maxim Velikov (born 1982), Russian professional ice hockey defenceman
 Sergei Monia (born 1983), Russian professional basketball player
 Anton Grebnev (born 1984), Russian professional football player
 Maxim Krivonozhkin (born 1984), Russian professional ice hockey forward
 Sergei Barsukov (born 1985), Russian professional football player
Nikolai Bondarenko (born 1985), Russian politician and blogger
 Andrei Murnin (born 1985), Russian professional football player
 Jurgita Dronina (born 1986), Russian-Lithuanian ballet dancer
 Katia Elizarova (born 1986), Russian model and actress
 Aleksey Ostapenko (born 1986), Russian volleyball player
 Vladimir Romanenko (born 1987), Russian professional football player
 Stanislav Romanov (born 1987), Russian professional ice hockey defenceman
 Evgeny Tomashevsky (born 1987), Russian chess Grandmaster and former World number 15
 Kombinaciya (founded 1988), Russian female pop band
 Zedd (born 1989), Russian-German Grammy Award-winning musician, music producer and DJ
 Artyom Molodtsov (born 1990), Russian professional football player
 Fyodor Smolov (born 1990), Russian professional football player

1991–2000 
 Alexandr Loginov (born 1992), Russian biathlete
 Valeria Solovyeva (born 1992), Russian tennis player
 Elvira T (born 1994), Russian singer and songwriter
 Artyom Timofeyev (born 1994), Russian professional football player

Lived in Saratov 

 Herwarth Walden (1879–1941), German Expressionist artist, critic, and courageous promoter of early 20th century avant-garde art. Killed in Saratov in a Soviet camp during Stalin's "Purges."
 Gavrila Derzhavin (1743–1816), one of the most highly esteemed Russian poets before Alexander Pushkin
 Alexander Radishchev (1749–1802), Russian author and social critic
 Jean-Victor Poncelet (1788–1867), French engineer and mathematician (prisoner of war)
 Nikolay Zinin (1812–1880), Russian organic chemist
 Alexey Bogolyubov (1824–1896), Russian landscape painter
 Lev Igorev (1821–1893), Russian portrait painter in the Academic style
 Ilya Salov (1834–1902), Russian writer, playwright and translator
 Mikhail Vrubel (1856–1910), Russian painter
 Fyodor Schechtel (1859–1926), Russian architect, graphic artist and stage designer, the most influential and prolific master of Russian Art Nouveau and late Russian Revival
 Pyotr Stolypin (1862–1911), 3rd Chairman of Council of Ministers of the Russian Empire, served as Prime Minister and Minister of Internal Affairs from 1906 to 1911
 Leonid Sobinov (1872–1934), Imperial Russian operatic tenor
 Kuzma Petrov-Vodkin (1878–1939), Russian and Soviet painter and writer
 Nikolai Vavilov (1887–1943), Russian and Soviet botanist and geneticist, died in a Saratov jail
 Mikhail Bulgakov (1891–1940), Russian writer and playwright
 Konstantin Paustovsky (1892–1968), Russian Soviet writer nominated for the Nobel Prize for literature in 1965
 Lidia Ruslanova (1900–1973), Russian folk singer
 Lev Kassil (1905–1970), Soviet writer of juvenile and young adult literature, depicting Soviet life, teenagers and their world, school, sports, cultural life and war
 Oleg Antonov (1906–1984), Soviet aircraft designer
 Alfred Schnittke (1934–1998), Soviet and Russian composer
 Boris M. Schein (born 1938), Russian-American mathematician
 Eduard Limonov (born 1943), Russian writer, poet, publicist and political dissident
 Oleg Yankovsky (1944–2009), Soviet Russian actor
 Valeriya (born 1968), Russian pop singer
 Anastasia Karpova (born 1984), Russian pop singer
 Natalia Pogonina (born 1985), Russian chess player who holds the FIDE title of Woman Grandmaster
 Polina Gagarina (born 1987), Russian pop singer

See also 

 List of Russian people
 List of Russian-language poets

Saratov
Saratov
List